The Crowder Formation is a geologic formation in the Central and Western Mojave Desert, in northern Los Angeles County and eastern San Bernardino County, in Southern California.

Areas where it is exposed include at the bases of the northern San Gabriel Mountains and northwestern San Bernardino Mountains, and in the Cajon Pass between them.

Geology
The Crowder Formation was formed during the Pliocene epoch of the Neogene period. The formation was deposited by drainages carrying distinctive volcanic and metamorphic clasts from the Victorville area southward.

It overlies the crystalline San Gabriel Basement Complex in its eastern section, and the San Francisquito Formation in its western section in the Antelope Valley/San Gabriels.

Fossils
The formation preserves fossils of insects, reptiles, rodents, birds, and larger mammals. The species date back to the Miocene and Pliocene epochs of the Neogene period. 29 taxa were collected by the 
San Bernardino County Museum from the Cajon Pass area of the Crowder Formation.

See also

 
 List of fossiliferous stratigraphic units in California
 Paleontology in California

References

"The Physical and Magnetic Stratigraphy of the Miocene Crowder Formation, Cajon Pass, Southern California"; by Douglas Scott Winston, University of Southern California; Los Angeles, 1985.

Miocene California
Pliocene California
Miocene geology
Pliocene geology
Geology of Los Angeles County, California
Geology of San Bernardino County, California
Natural history of the Mojave Desert
Antelope Valley
San Bernardino Mountains
San Gabriel Mountains
Miocene Series of North America
Pliocene Series of North America
Geologic formations of California